Futebol Clube de Amares (abbreviated as FC Amares) is a Portuguese football club based in Amares in the district of Braga.

Background
FC Amares currently plays in the AF Braga – Pró-Nacional which is the fourth tier of Portuguese football. The club was founded in 1945 and they play their home matches at the Engenheiro José Carlos Macedo in Amares. The stadium is able to accommodate 5,000 spectators.

The club is affiliated to Associação de Futebol de Braga and has competed in the AF Braga Taça. The club has also entered the national cup competition known as Taça de Portugal on occasions.

Appearances
Liga de Honra: 1

Season to season

Honours
AF Braga Taça: 	2004/05

Footnotes

External links
Official website 

Football clubs in Portugal
Association football clubs established in 1945
1945 establishments in Portugal